Xianzong may refer to:

Emperor Xianzong of Tang (憲宗) (778–820; reigned 805–820), Chinese emperor of the Tang Dynasty
Emperor Xianzong of Western Xia (獻宗) (1181–1226; reigned 1223-1226), Tangut emperor of the Western Xia Dynasty
Möngke Khan (1209–1259), Mongol Khan, posthumously known as Emperor Xianzong (憲宗) of the Yuan Dynasty
Chenghua Emperor (1447–1487; reigned 1464–1487), Chinese emperor of the Ming Dynasty, also known as Emperor Xianzong (憲宗) of the Ming Dynasty

See also
Hien Tong (disambiguation), Vietnamese equivalents

Temple name disambiguation pages